Sirak (also Romanized as Sīrak; also known as Sīrkeh) is a village in Zagheh Rural District, Zagheh District, Khorramabad County, Lorestan Province, Iran. At the 2006 census, its population was 76, in 19 families.

References 

Towns and villages in Khorramabad County